The 2017 Worcestershire County Council election took place on 4 May 2017 as part of the 2017 local elections in the United Kingdom. All 57 councillors were elected from 53 electoral divisions which returned either one or two county councillors each by first-past-the-post voting for a four-year term of office. The Conservatives extended their majority in the council, gaining ten seats, largely at the expense of Labour and UKIP, who lost six seats between them; the Conservative majority increased from one seat to eleven. The number of seats for the Liberal Democrats and Green remained the same, with the Conservatives gaining the remaining five seats from independent politicians and candidates from smaller parties. The Conservatives lost one seat, Alvechurch, to an independent. The Liberals lost their only seat, St Chads in the Wyre Forest district, after they decided not to field any candidates; the Liberal Democrats held the seat, however. UKIP lost all their seats in this election to the Conservatives.

Results

Bromsgrove

Malvern Hills

Redditch

Worcester

Wychavon

Wyre Forest

References

2017
2017 English local elections
2010s in Worcestershire